The Fourth Judgement is the third studio album released (fourth recorded) by American power metal band Jag Panzer, released in 1997. It features the return of the band's original vocalist, Harry "The Tyrant" Conklin, and the replacement of Chris Kostka on lead guitar by Joey Tafolla. The band returns to a more epic power metal feel on this album, as opposed to the thrash influence on Dissident Alliance.

It was re-released June 5, 2007 with a new cover and three bonus songs from the band’s 1996 demo sessions - the demo that got the band signed to Century Media.

Songs

Personnel
Harry Conklin – vocals
Mark Briody – rhythm guitar
Joey Tafolla – lead guitar
John Tetley – bass guitar
Rikard Stjernquist – drums

References

1997 albums
Jag Panzer albums
Century Media Records albums